The FIFA World Cup, sometimes called the Football World Cup or the Soccer World Cup, but usually referred to simply as the World Cup, is an international association football competition contested by the men's national teams of the members of Fédération Internationale de Football Association (FIFA), the sport's global governing body. The championship has been awarded every four years since the first tournament in 1930, except in 1942 and 1946 due to World War II.

The tournament consists of two parts, the qualification phase and the final phase (officially called the World Cup Finals). The qualification phase, which currently take place over the three years preceding the Finals, is used to determine which teams qualify for the Finals. The current format of the Finals involves 32 teams competing for the title, at venues within the host nation (or nations) over a period of about a month. The World Cup Finals is the most widely viewed sporting event in the world, with an estimated 715.1 million people watching the 2006 tournament final.

Switzerland have appeared in the finals of the World Cup on twelve occasions, and have reached the quarter-finals three times, in 1934, 1938 and 1954.

World Cup record
Switzerland's record at FIFA World Cups:

*Draws include knockout matches decided on penalty kicks.

By match

Match records

1934 FIFA World Cup
The group stage used in the first World Cup was discarded in favour of a straight knockout tournament.

1938 FIFA World Cup

1950 FIFA World Cup

1954 FIFA World Cup
Switzerland hosted the tournament in 1954 and reached the quarter-final for a third time, where the team was beaten 7–5 by neighbouring Austria.

Switzerland finished ahead of Italy by winning a play-off

1962 FIFA World Cup
After missing out on the previous tournament, Switzerland qualified for the 1962 edition, held in Chile. Unfortunately, they finished at the bottom of Group 2 without a single point, having lost all their matches.

1966 FIFA World Cup
Despite securing back-to-back qualification for the FIFA World Cups, Switzerland's performance in the 1966 edition was far more abysmal. They lost all of their matches once more, including a 5-0 walloping by eventual runners-up West Germany in their opening game. To date, this remains as Switzerland's worst performance.

This was also Switzerland's last FIFA World Cup campaign in 28 years, as their next appearance at the tournament would come in the 1994 edition.

West Germany was placed first due to superior goal average.

1994 FIFA World Cup

Note: Switzerland's fourth goal is also credited to Georges Bregy.

2006 FIFA World Cup

The World Cup 2006 in Germany was the first World Cup for Switzerland since their participation at the World Cup 1994. After finishing second behind France in qualifying group 4, they defeated Turkey in the play-off round 2–0 and 4–2 to qualify for the main tournament.

In the group stage, they played again against France. The game played in Stuttgart ended in a goalless draw. After defeating Togo 2–0 in Dortmund and South Korea also 2–0 in Hannover, they finished first in group G and qualified for the knockout stage. In the second round of the tournament, they faced Ukraine in Cologne. The game had to be decided in a penalty shootout since no goal was scored after 120 minutes. Ukraine won the shootout 3–0. Switzerland was the only team in tournament not to have conceded a goal during regulation time in their matches. Switzerland's top scorer at the tournament was Alexander Frei with two goals. When Switzerland lost 3–0 on penalties, that was the first time that a team lost on penalties without scoring a single goal in the penalties.

All times local (CEST/UTC+2)

2010 FIFA World Cup
Switzerland were the only team to beat eventual world champion Spain, by a 0–1 victory in the group stage. In spite of this, they did not survive the first round.

2014 FIFA World Cup
At the 2014 FIFA World Cup, Switzerland were drawn in Group E along with Ecuador, France, and Honduras. They opened their campaign with a 2–1 victory over Ecuador in Brasilia. However, in their next match, they suffered a 5–2 defeat to France. Despite the initial setback, a 3–0 victory in their final game against Honduras, courtesy of a hat-trick by Xherdan Shaqiri sent them into the round of 16, where they faced the two-time world champions and eventual runners-up Argentina.

The game was goalless and nearly heading to penalties when Ángel Di María scored a 118th-minute extra time goal to send Argentina into the quarter-finals. Despite being eliminated in the round of 16, it was Switzerland's best performance in eight years.

All times local: five matches are in Brasília official time (UTC−3), while Honduras v Switzerland, played in Manaus, is in the Amazon time zone (UTC−4).

Record players

Top goalscorers

With six goals at Switzerland's home tournament in 1954, Josef Hügi won the shared Silver Boot - the only individual FIFA World Cup award ever received by a Swiss player.

Squads

References

External links
Switzerland at FIFA
World Cup Finals Statistics

 
Countries at the FIFA World Cup
Switzerland national football team